Our Lady of Aparecida - Our Lady Revealed - ( or  ) is a title of the Blessed Virgin Mary associated with the Immaculate Conception. 

Her image, a clay statue, is widely venerated by Brazilian Catholics, who consider her as the principal patroness of Brazil. Historical accounts state that the statue was originally found by three fishermen who miraculously caught many fish after invoking the Blessed Virgin Mary. The statue is currently housed in the Basilica of the National Shrine of Our Lady Aparecida in Aparecida, São Paulo, Brazil.

Colonial documents and papal bulls have referred to the image as Nossa Senhora da Conceição Aparecida. The building in which the image is venerated was granted the title of a minor basilica by Pope John Paul II in 1980, and is the largest Marian shrine in the world, being able to hold up to 45,000 worshippers.

The following papal documents concern the famed statue:

 Pope Leo XIII mentioned the Brazilian devotion in 1903.
 Pope Pius X granted a canonical coronation to the image on 8 December 1904. 
 Pope Pius XI declared Mary under this title Patroness of Brazil through a papal bull of 16 July 1930, signed by Cardinal Eugenio Pacelli.
 Pope Paul VI granted the image her first golden rose on 12 August 1967. 
 Pope John Paul II consecrated her new shrine and on the same date raised it to the rank of minor basilica on 4 July 1980
 Pope Benedict XVI granted the image her second golden rose on 12 May 2007. 
 Pope Francis granted the third golden rose on 9 October 2017, honoring the 300th anniversary of the devotion.

History
According to the account of the discovery of the statue in October 1717, Dom Pedro de Almeida, Count of Assumar and Governor of the Province of São Paulo and Minas Gerais, was passing through the area of Guaratinguetá, a small city in the Paraíba river valley, during a trip to Vila Rica, an important gold mining site.

As the people of Guaratinguetá decided to hold a feast in his honour, three fishermen, Domingos Garcia, João Alves, and Filipe Pedroso went down to the Paraíba waters to fish. The fishermen prayed to Our Lady of the Immaculate Conception that God would grant a good catch. The fishermen, having a run of bad luck, cast their nets in the River Paraiba and dragged up a headless statue of the Virgin Mary. They also salvaged the head and, according to the legend, then netted plenty of fish. After cleaning the statue, they found that it was a black version of Our Lady of the Immaculate Conception. Legend has it that when the fishermen recovered the body, then the head, the slender figure of the Aparecida Virgin became so heavy that they couldn't budge it.

The fishermen named the statue Nossa Senhora da Conceição Aparecida.  Neighbors began to venerate the statue, which came to be known as Our Lady Appeared, and devotion grew. The first chapel was built in 1745.

Devotion to the statue grew rapidly, particularly among Afro-Brazilians, not only for its black Madonna status, but also because it was reported to have performed a miracle for an enslaved young man. Over the years following its discovery, veneration of the Virgin invoked as Aparecida increased as many miracles were attributed to her. For the following fifteen years, the statue remained within Filipe Pedroso's family, and neighbors came to venerate it. Stories of Our Lady of Aparecida's miracles were spread throughout Brazil, and the Pedroso family built her a chapel which soon became too small for so many worshippers. In 1737 the priest of Guaratinguetá built her a chapel on the Morro dos Coqueiros (Hill of Coconut Palms), where public visits began in July 1745.

The number of worshippers increased dramatically, and in 1834 work on a larger church was begun; this became known as the "Old Basilica" when work on the even larger "New Basilica" was started in 1955; it received pontifical approbation in 1980.

In 1928 the "City of Aparecida" was consolidated around the old Basílica

The image
According to a local tale the clay statue was imported from Portugal; others say that it was made by Frei Agostinho de Jesus, a monk from São Paulo known for crafting artistic sacred images in clay. The small statue is less than three feet tall. The image was made around 1650, and must have been underwater for years, since it lost its original polychromy.

The image is dark brown, and covered by a stiff dark blue robe of richly embroidered thick cloth emblazoned with the flags of Brazil and the Vatican City State with golden clasps. An imperial crown was added in 1904.

A bronze replica of the same image is sponsored by the Embassy of Brazil to the Vatican and was approved for installation within the Gardens of the Vatican City under the mandate of Pope Francis, officially held on 3 September 2016.

First patronage
At the written request of Emperor Pedro I of Brazil, Pope Leo XII declared Saint Peter of Alcantara the "Patron of Brazil" on 31 May 1826. The ruler of Brazil at that time, Pedro I (born Prince Pedro de Alcantara), was named after Saint Peter of Alcantara. Later, as the Virgin Mary outranks St. Peter of Alcantara in the Catholic hierarchy of saints, with the proclamation of the Virgin Aparecida as the principal Catholic patron saint of Brazil, St. Peter became the secondary patron.

Canonical coronation
On the Feast of the Immaculate Conception 1904, to commemorate the 50th anniversary of the 1854 proclamation of the dogma of the Immaculate Conception, the statue of Our Lady Aparecida was Canonically crowned by the archbishop of São Paulo, Lino Deodato Rodrigues, at the decree of the Holy See and in the presence of the Apostolic Nuncio. The Coronation was performed in the name and on behalf of Pope Pius X who granted this approval. The papal coronation of the image of Aparecida was a major event attended by many people and by civil authorities including President Rodrigues Alves, who made the point of witnessing the act in spite of the separation of Church and State that had been instituted when Brazil became a Republic, less than twenty years before. The gold used for the manufacture of the Crown was donated by the head of Brazil's Imperial Family, the exiled Princess Isabel.

After the pontifical coronation of 1904 the Holy See granted a divine office and Mass for her feast day.

Twenty years later, the village that had grown around the church on Coqueiros hill became a municipality, named after the saint.

Papal Bull of 1930
On 16 July 1930, Pope Pius XI declared the Immaculate Conception under the title of Our Lady Aparecida to be the principal patroness of Brazil, namely widespread in the Archdiocese of Rio de Janeiro.

The pontifical decree indicated that Pope Leo XIII granted the approval on the devotion of the image under the title "Nossa Senhora da Conceição Apparecida". In addition, Saint Pope Pius X established the Office of the Mass under this honor and allowing this devotion to spread due to the widespread piety of the Brazilian people. The Papal decree mentions the 1904 solid gold crown given to the image (assumingly from Isabel, Princess Imperial of Brazil). It does not however, mention the shrine being elevated to a minor basilica.

Furthermore, the devotion was researched and approved by Cardinal Camillo Laurenti, Prefect of the Sacred Congregation of Rites. The papal bull was signed and witnessed by Cardinal Eugenio Pacelli.
 
In the wake of the papal decree naming Our Lady Aparecida Patroness of Brazil, on July 16, 1930, Cardinal Sebastião Leme da Silveira Cintra, the Archbishop of Rio de Janeiro (then the Capital of Brazil), rededicated Brazil to the Virgin under this Marian title.

Later years
Up until the early 1950s, Aparecida remained an unassuming city with a small community of Redemptorists. They arrived from the sanctuary of the Virgin of  Altötting in Germany and took on the responsibility for the shrine of Our Lady Aparecida, making it the first Redemptorist parish in Latin America. Devotion to the Marian image grew under Padre Vítor Coelho (1899-1987), a Redemptorist priest and catechist. In 1958, due to the growth of the Catholic community around the Marian Shrine of Aparecida, the Holy See decided to erect the Metropolitan Archdiocese of Aparecida, separating its territory in part from the Archdiocese of São Paulo and in part from the Diocese of Taubaté and transferring three suffragan Dioceses that previously were subject to the Metropolitan Archbishop of São Paulo to form the new ecclesiastical province of Aparecida. The new See was led by administrators until 1964, when the first Archbishop of Aparecida was appointed.

Contrary to popular belief, John Paul II was the first Pope to consecrate the shrine with the title of Basilica on July 4, 1980. In his Apostolic message, the Pontiff mentioned the coronation of 1904, the Patronage granted in 1930, and his culminating purpose of consecration of the shrine as a Basilica during that time. By research in Vatican documents, there is no mention of 1908 proclamations of the shrine as a Basilica by the Pope or any Vatican prelate.

Pope Francis installed a replica of the same Marian image within the Vatican Gardens in September 2016 via the diplomatic efforts of the Brazilian embassy to the Holy See.

Assault on the image

The image became the source of religious conflicts between Catholics and Protestants, primarily driven by non-mainline churches identified with charismatic, evangelical, or fundamentalist theology, including all branches of Pentecostalism, due to the nature of Catholic Marian devotion associated with the religious image.

On May 16, 1978, a person identified as a member of a Protestant sect took the statue from its niche on the basilica after the last Mass of the day. He was chased by guards and some of the church goers. As he was caught, the statue fell to the ground breaking to pieces; a group of artists and artisans pieced it together again.
 
On her feast day in 1995, a public holiday, an incident later known as "kicking of the saint" took place when televangelist Sérgio Von Helder (or Helde), of the Universal Church of the Kingdom of God (UCKG), insulted and kicked a replica of Our Lady Aparecida, and said that "it could not do anything for you", on a late-night religious program broadcast by UCKG television station Rede Record. On the following day, Rede Globo's Jornal Nacional denounced the incident, causing a nationwide commotion. The event was perceived by Catholics as a major act of religious intolerance, causing a public outcry. Several temples of the UCKG were targeted by protesters, and Von Helder was transferred to South Africa until the end of the controversy.

The New Basilica

In the mid-20th century, as the popularity of Our Lady Aparecida grew, the construction of a much larger building to shelter the image became necessary. In 1955, work on the present Basilica of the National Shrine of Our Lady Aparecida was begun. Architect Benedito Calixto designed a building in the form of a Greek cross. It can hold up to 45,000 people.

On July 4, 1980, while still under construction, the new church was consecrated by Pope John Paul II and given the title of minor basilica. It is currently the largest Marian temple and the second largest Basilica in the world, second only to St. Peter's in the Vatican City.

Since then, the two Basilicas in the city of Aparecida have been known as the "Old Basilica" and the "New Basilica". Upon its completion, the Brazilian Conference of Catholic Bishops declared the new Basilica a National Shrine.

As the National Shrine, dedicated to the patroness of Brazil, one of the functions of the basilica is to function as a site of pilgrimage for laborers. The traditional pilgrimage of the laborers takes place each year on Brazil's independence holiday, September 7. According to recent estimates, the basilica attracts about 8 million pilgrims a year.

The influence of Our Lady Aparecida on Brazilian Catholic society is incalculable. In 1992 a study showed that 296 parishes were dedicated to her while five cathedrals had the same title. In addition, many towns are named after the Virgin and so are many Brazilian women and girls. The modern art styled cathedral of Brasilia designed by Oscar Niemeyer is dedicated to Our Lady Aparecida, as Brasilia is the national capital and she is invoked as Brazil's special protector.

In 2004, to commemorate the centennial of the pontifical coronation commanded by Pope Pius X and the 150th anniversary of the dogmatic definition of the Immaculate Conception of the Blessed Virgin Mary, the statue of Our Lady Aparecida was granted a renewed canonical coronation by the Holy See. The renewed coronation was presided by the Archbishop emeritus of Rio de Janeiro, Cardinal Eugênio Sales, in the capacity of special papal envoy of Pope John Paul II.

On May 12, 2007 Pope Benedict XVI granted the Basilica of the National Shrine of Our Lady Aparecida a Golden Rose. The "Old Basilica" also possesses a Golden Rose, awarded by Pope Paul VI on August 12, 1967, and presented by the Apostolic Nuncio; it was a gift of the Holy See to mark the Pope's participation in the commemorations of the 250th anniversary of the devotion to the Virgin of Aparecida. The "New Basilica"'s Golden Rose was presented by Pope Benedict, who visited the basilica and celebrated Mass there during his 2007 Apostolic visit to Brazil. Pope Francis celebrated Mass at the shrine on July 24, 2013, and entrusted his pontificate as well as the World Youth Day to the maternal protection of the Blessed Virgin Mary.

Feast day

Since the 19th century, the Feast Day of Our Lady Aparecida is celebrated on October 12. The date coincides with the Emperor Pedro I of Brazil acclamation and birthday in 1822, and is regarded in Brazilian culture as Children's Day. In the Roman Rite Catholic Liturgical Calendar approved for Brazil, the day of Our Lady Aparecida ranks as a solemnity, and is a holy day of obligation. The feast's rank as a day of precept was established by the Holy See at the request of the National Conference of Brazilian Bishops.

The feast day of Our Lady Aparecida has been a National Holiday in Brazil since 1980. The federal statute declaring October 12 a national holiday in honour of "Our Lady Aparecida", Patroness of Brazil, was passed by Congress and signed into law on June 30, 1980, during Pope John Paul II's first visit to the country; that was also the first visit by a Pope to Brazil, and during that visit the "New Basilica" of Aparecida was consecrated.

Cultural references 

The telenovela A Padroeira (The Patroness), broadcast on Rede Globo between June 18, 2001, and February 23, 2002, was a fictional portrayal of the finding of the Our Lady Aparecida statue, loosely based on the 1865 novel As Minas de Prata by José de Alencar, which itself had been adapted for the telenovela format in 1966 by the now defunct TV Excelsior.

See also 
 Our Lady of the Pillar, an ancient tradition which also has a feast on October 12
 Roman Catholicism in Brazil

References

External links 

Prayer Of John Paul II In The Basilica of Aparecida, 4 July 1980
Official website of the National Shrine of Our Lady Aparecida 

Shrines to the Virgin Mary
Catholic devotions
Titles of Mary
Statues of the Virgin Mary
National symbols of Brazil
Catholic pilgrimage sites
Catholic Church in Brazil
Marian apparitions
Vandalized works of art